The Southern Amateur is an amateur golf tournament. It has been played since 1902 and is organized by the Southern Golf Association. From 
1902 to 1963, it was played at match play. Since 1964, it has been played at stroke play.

In December 2021, the Southern Amateur joined with six other tournaments to form the Elite Amateur Golf Series.

Winners

2022 David Ford
2021 Maxwell Moldovan
2020 Mac Meissner
2019 A. J. Ott
2018 Patrick Cover
2017 Karl Vilips
2016 Jimmy Stanger
2015 Taylor Funk
2014 M. J. Maguire
2013 Zachary Olsen
2012 Peter Williamson
2011 Harris English
2010 Alex Carpenter
2009 Gregor Main
2008 Kyle Stanley
2007 Webb Simpson
2006 Kyle Stanley
2005 Webb Simpson
2004 Michael Sim
2003 Casey Wittenberg
2002 Lee Williams
2001 Cody Freeman
2000 Ryan Hybl
1999 Edward Loar
1998 Kris Maffet
1997 Ed Brooks
1996 Rob Manor
1995 Lee Eagleton
1994 Trey Sones
1993 Justin Leonard
1992 Justin Leonard
1991 Bill Brown
1990 Jason Widener
1989 Jason Widener
1988 Joe Hamorski
1987 Rob McNamara
1986 Rob McNamara
1985 Len Mattiace
1984 Scott Dunlap
1983 Pat Stephens
1982 Steve Lowery
1981 Mark Brooks
1980 Bob Tway
1979 Rafael Alarcón
1978 Jim Woodward
1977 Lindy Miller
1976 Tim Simpson
1975 Vinny Giles
1974 Danny Yates
1973 Ben Crenshaw
1972 Bill Rogers
1971 Ben Crenshaw
1970 Lanny Wadkins
1969 Hubert Green
1968 Lanny Wadkins
1967 Vinny Giles
1966 Hubert Green
1965 Billy Joe Patton
1964 Dale Morey
1963 Mike Malarkey
1962 Bunky Henry
1961 Billy Joe Patton
1960 Charlie Smith
1959 Richard Crawford
1958 Hugh Royer Jr.
1957 Ed Brantly
1956 Arnold Blum
1955 Charlie Harrison
1954 Joe Conrad
1953 Joe Conrad
1952 Gay Brewer
1951 Arnold Blum
1950 Dale Morey
1949 Tommy Barnes
1948 Gene Dahlbender
1947 Tommy Barnes
1946 George Hamer
1942–45 No tournament
1941 Sam Perry
1940 Neil White
1939 Bobby Dunkelberger
1938 Carl Dann, Jr.
1937 Fred Haas
1936 Jack Munger
1935 Bobby Riegel
1934 Fred Haas
1933 Ralph Redmond
1932 Sam Perry
1931 Chasteen Harris
1930 R. E. Spicer, Jr.
1929 Sam Perry
1928 Watts Gunn
1927 Harry Ehle
1926 R. E. Spicer, Jr.
1925 Glenn Crisman
1924 Jack Wenzler
1923 Perry Adair
1922 Bobby Jones
1921 Perry Adair
1920 Bobby Jones
1919 Nelson Whitney
1918 No tournament
1917 Bobby Jones
1916 R. G. Bush
1915 C. L. Dexter
1914 Nelson Whitney
1913 Nelson Whitney
1912 W. P. Stewart
1911 W. P. Stewart
1910 F. G. Byrd
1909 J. P. Edrington
1908 Nelson Whitney
1907 Nelson Whitney
1906 Leigh Carroll
1905 Andrew Manson
1904 Andrew Manson
1903 A. W. Gaines
1902 A. F. Schwartz

Source:

References

External links
Southern Golf Association
Southern Amateur Championship

Amateur golf tournaments in the United States